Illinois Route 94 is a north–south state highway in western Illinois. It runs from U.S. Route 24 (US 24) just east of Camp Point to U.S. Route 67 just south of Oak Grove, just south of the Quad Cities area.

Route description 

Illinois 94 follows a complicated route north from Camp Point on its way to the Quad Cities area, making no fewer than eighteen 90-degree turns along the length of the route. It overlaps Illinois Route 61, Illinois Route 336, U.S. Route 136, Illinois Route 9, U.S. Route 34, Illinois Route 135 and Illinois Route 17.

History 
SBI Route 94 ran from Taylor Ridge, west of U.S. 67, to La Harpe, at Illinois 9. There was also a spur to Alexis, northwest of Galesburg. In March 1937 that spur was changed to Illinois Route 135, and the main route extended south to Bowen, replacing Illinois Route 94A, parts of Illinois Route 96 and Illinois Route 36. In 1955 it was extended further south to its current terminus, partially replacing Illinois Route 102. It was also extended north to U.S. 67.

Illinois 36 also ran on portions of Illinois Route 61 and U.S. Route 36.

Future 

This route is part of the Illinois Route 336 project in western Illinois.

Major intersections

References

External links

094
Transportation in Adams County, Illinois
Transportation in Hancock County, Illinois
Transportation in Henderson County, Illinois
Transportation in Warren County, Illinois
Transportation in Mercer County, Illinois
Transportation in Rock Island County, Illinois